The United Front Party (UPF) is a recently formed Ghanaian political party.  The party's founder is Dr. Nana Agyenim Boateng. He has been reported as saying the party was founded as an alternative to Ghana's two main political parties, the New Patriotic Party and  National Democratic Congress party.

References

Political parties in Ghana
Political parties with year of establishment missing